Krishna Tulasi  is a 2018 Indian Kannada-language romantic drama film directed by newcomer Sukesh Nayak.

Plot 
Krishna (Sanchari Vijay), a visually impaired man, moves to Mysuru after he gets a job at the university. He befriends Tulasi (Meghashree), a dubbing artiste who is also visually impaired, takes the same bus as he does. Neither of them realizes that the other is 
person is also visually impaired. Whether or not they figure this out and fall in love forms the rest of the story.

Cast 
Sanchari Vijay as Krishna
Meghashree as Tulasi
Kuri Pratap
 Tabla Nani
Ramesh Bhat
Suchendra Prasad
 Padmaja Rao

Soundtrack
The songs were composed by Kiran Ravindranath.

"Sogasaagi" – Kiran Ravindranath
"Yeno Hosa Nantu" – Armaan Malik
"Lokana Nammange" – Tippu
"Khali Kanninali" – Anuradha Bhat, Rajesh Krishnan
"Kandey Iralilla"  – Varun Pradeep

Release 
The Times of India gave the film three out of five stars and wrote that "Go ahead, watch Krishna Tulasi if you like simple unadulterated romance that comes straight from the heart".

References

External links 

2018 directorial debut films
Indian romantic drama films
2018 romantic drama films